Hurricane Hilary was a powerful tropical cyclone that caused significant flooding in southwestern Mexico in late September 2011. The fourth Category 4 and major hurricane, seventh hurricane, and eighth tropical storm of the 2011 Pacific hurricane season, Hilary developed from an area of low pressure off the Pacific coast of Central America in mid-September. Organizing quickly, the system became a tropical depression on September 21, after gaining enough organization to be declared as such. While moving towards the west-northwest, the depression continued to gather strength and was subsequently upgraded to a tropical storm just several hours later. On September 21, Hilary was declared as a Category 1 hurricane, while located close to the Mexican coastline, where the storm brought heavy rainfall and flooding. Undergoing rapid intensification, Hilary strengthened into a Category 4 hurricane on September 22, recognized with a distinct eye feature. Beginning to enter cooler Ocean temperatures, Hilary began to weaken by September 25 but briefly restrengthened into a Category 4 the following day. Atmospheric conditions became increasingly unfavorable late on September 26, and the system began to weaken. During the afternoon hours of September 30, Hilary became a remnant low, while located several hundred miles away from any landmasses.

Meteorological history

On September 7, a tropical wave moved off the coast of Africa. During the nighttime hours of September 18, an area of showers and thunderstorms associated with a broad area of low pressure was observed a couple of hundred miles south-southeast of the Gulf of Tehuantepec as it moved westward. The following day, the area of disturbed weather began to become better organized, and the National Hurricane Center (NHC) upgraded its chances of tropical cyclone development to the "Medium" category. Moving towards the west-northwest, the area of disturbed weather was upgraded into a tropical depression during the morning hours of September 21, after radar data showed that the low pressure area had gained enough structure to be declared as such. Due to a favorable upper regime characterized by low wind shear and a moist environment, the National Hurricane Center predicted intensification into a hurricane within two days.  Later on September 21, despite the fact that rainbands on the western semicircle of the depression became less defined, the depression acquired gale-force winds, and was subsequently upgraded into a tropical storm, earning the name Hilary. That afternoon, the Government of Mexico issued a tropical storm watch for parts of the Mexican coastline, indicating that rainfall totals of 3–5 inches, with isolated 10 inch amounts, were possible.

On September 22, while quickly strengthening, Hilary was upgraded to a Category 1 hurricane on the Saffir-Simpson hurricane scale. It was noted by the National Hurricane Center that strengthening into a major hurricane, defined by a hurricane with winds that exceed , was likely over the coming days. Just several hours later, Hilary was recorded as a rapidly strengthening Category 2 hurricane located nearby the Mexican coastline. At 00:00 UTC September 23, Hilary was upgraded into a major hurricane, the fourth of the season. Continuing to rapidly strengthen, Hilary became a Category 4 hurricane just a few hours later after becoming a Category 3, and reached a peak intensity of 145 mph (235 km/h) at 0600 UTC September 23 (11 p.m. AST September 22). However, the storm began to enter an area of higher wind shear and cooler ocean temperatures on September 24, and Hilary began to weaken. The hurricane weakened back down to a Category 3 hurricane early on September 25, but was later upgraded briefly to a Category 4 again the following afternoon.

Several hours later, the storm was once again downgraded into a Category 3 hurricane, and during the afternoon hours of September 27, Hilary was further downgraded into a Category 2 hurricane. Early on the following morning, Hilary weakened into a Category 1 hurricane, before weakening further into a tropical storm on September 28. Losing a lot of its convection on September 30, the National Hurricane Center noted that Hilary had weakened into a tropical depression. Several hours later, after sustaining no deep convection atop its center, Hilary was declared a remnant low, located several hundred miles away from any landmasses.

Preparations and impact
Tropical cyclone watches and warnings were therefore issued for portions of the Pacific coast of Mexico. A red emergency alert was additionally in place for the region; officials urged residents to be prepared to evacuate, and tourists were advised to stay indoors. Due to rough surf, small craft advisories were put in effect, and swimmers were advised to take extreme caution. The port of Acapulco was closed for small vessels, and a moderate to high alert for strong winds and rain was noted.

Also in the state, four rivers overflowed their banks; one river received  of excess water in a single day. Low-lying areas, such as grasslands and pastures, experienced major flooding, prompting farmers to evacuate their livestock. In Villahermosa, the downpours resulted in the collapse of water drains, flooding many streets and stranding cars. Across Guerrero, three people were initially reported missing, but all three were later found. Twenty-thousand residents were advised to evacuated due to rising floodwaters.

See also

Other storms with the same name
List of Category 4 Pacific hurricanes

References

External links

Hilary
Hilary
Hilary